"Põhjamaa" (Estonian for Northern/Nordic Land/Country), also "Laul Põhjamaast" (Estonian for Song of the Northern/Nordic Land/Country), is a song by Enn Vetemaa to a melody by Ülo Vinter, originally for an Estonian musical adaptation of Pippi Longstocking.  The song has been recurring in Estonian Song Festivals. "Põhjamaa" was considered by some to be a good candidate for the anthem of Republic of Estonia after it reestablished its independence but it was deemed unfitting as its subject was Sweden, not Estonia.

Lyrics

References 
 Longstocking Music

External links 
 Choral rendition at Youtube
 Movie rendition at Youtube
 Pan flute rendition at estmusic.com

Estonian songs